The Republic of China Marine Corps (ROCMC), also known colloquially as the Taiwan Marine Corps, is the amphibious arm of the Republic of China Navy (ROCN) responsible for amphibious combat, counter-landing and reinforcement of the areas under the jurisdiction of the Republic of China (ROC), including the island of Taiwan, Kinmen, and the Matsu Islands, and defense of ROCN facilities, also functioning as a rapid reaction force and a strategic reserve capable of amphibious assaults.

Established in 1914 on Mainland China, the ROCMC is considered an elite force within the ROC Armed Forces and is well known for its "Road to Heaven" stage in its 10-week amphibious training program.
The ROC Marines trains with the USMC though these are generally classified, unofficial, or with trainees officially considered by either side as "observers."

Organization 

The Marine Corps Command is subordinate to the Navy GHQ, the General Staff, the Minister of Defense, and the ROC President.

Current organization 
 Marine Corps Command
 Corps HQ Battalion(November 1, 2013, it was cut and reorganized to the Combat Support Group)
 Battalion HQ company(November 1, 2013, it was cut and reorganized to the Combat Support Group Support Company)
 Health company
 honor guard company
 Security Guard company
 Shooting training team
 Logistics company
 272nd Company of the Marine Corps Military Police
 Military band
 Amphibious Armor Group
 4 Amphibious Transport Squadrons, 24+ tracks per squadron. 1st (AAV-7), 2nd (AAV-7), 3rd (LVT-5), 4th (LVT-5).
 2 Amphibious Artillery Squadrons, mortars, 1st (LVT-5) and 2nd (LVT-5).
 Amphibious Reconnaissance and Patrol Unit: nicknamed "Frogmen" and regarded as the Taiwanese military counterpart to the U.S. Navy SEALs, over half of the 600 troops of this unit are aboriginal Taiwanese.
3 Reconnaissance Company
 1 Special Service Company
 1 Underwater Demolition Company
 1 Support Company
 Combat Support Group, combined formerly the Beach Logistics Group and the Communications, Information, Electronic Warfare Group, and Corps HQ Battalion
 Support Squadron, combined formerly the battalion HQ company
 Wuchiu Garrison Command
 Armed Force Joint Operation Training Base
Marine Corps Command
 66th Marine Brigade 'Vanguard', Taipei area, receiving M60A3TTS to replace M41 tanks
 77th Marine Brigade 'Iron Guards', Garrison brigade, CCK and other area all over Taiwan
 99th Marine Brigade 'Iron Force', Kaohsiung

History 

The ROC Marine Corps were formed from the former Navy Sentry Corps in December 1914.

During the Second Sino-Japanese War, the ROC marines saw little in amphibious warfare for the Japanese dominated the seas & thus saw combat in the same form as the regular infantry.

Likewise, during the civil war, the ROC marines were either absorbed as regular infantry units, or played as supporting role. However, in 1947, the ROC Marine Corps was reconstituted & saw action Mawei, Fujian.

The Marine Corps used to be 2 divisions, 66th and 99th divisions, in size, when its doctrine focused on retaking mainland China. Since its transition to a defensive posture, the ROCMC has been downsized towards a focus as a small rapid reaction force, a strategic reserve, and has learned skills compatible with guerrilla warfare operations. The Marine Corps is by design trained and equipped for transport by the ROC Navy to conduct amphibious assaults to defend Taiwan's outlying islands and Taiwan's coasts.

In 2004, the ROCMC redeployed a brigade near the Taipei area to defend against a possible PRC decapitation strike.

Since its formation the ROC Marine Corps has received training from the United States Marine Corps, from 1979 to 2020 that training was conducted secretly however in 2020 the annual month long training exercise held with trainers from the USMC's Marine Raider Regiment was conducted publicly.

Equipment

Equipment gallery

Ranks

Commissioned officer ranks
The rank insignia of commissioned officers.

Other ranks
The rank insignia of non-commissioned officers and enlisted personnel.

Gallery

See also 
 Republic of China Navy
 People's Liberation Army Navy Marine Corps

References

External links 

China, Republic of
Marines
Military units and formations established in 1914
1914 establishments in China